Link Snacks, Inc., better known as Jack Link's Protein Snacks, is an American snack company best known as the producer and marketer of the eponymous brand of beef jerky. It was founded by John 'Jack' Link in 1986, using his great-grandfather's recipes. They are known for their "Messin' with Sasquatch" ads. 

In addition to their original facility in Minong, Wisconsin, the company also has facilities across the Midwest including in New Glarus, Wisconsin; Alpena, South Dakota; Mankato, Minnesota; Laurens, Iowa; and Underwood, Iowa;and its  marketing office in Minneapolis.

On April 1, 2014, Jack Link's acquired Unilever's meat snack division in an attempt to expand its consumer base into Europe. The acquisition includes the BiFi brand, sold across Europe and Peperami, which retails in the UK and Ireland; and the manufacturing unit in Ansbach, Germany.

In addition to traditional beef jerky, the company also manufactures bacon jerky, made with salt-and-sugar cured pork meat.

In 2019 Jack Links acquired the Golden Island brand from Tyson Foods.

Advertising
In 2013, they signed a sponsorship deal with the Seattle Mariners.

Also in 2013, Jack Link's Jerky appeared in mid-credits scenes in Season 1 of the Hulu animated show The Awesomes.

In April 2015 Jack Link's Beef Jerky changed its logo "to better represent the brand’s 'Feed Your Wild Side' positioning and overall appeal." This new logo was designed by Davis Design of Mississauga, Ontario.

In 2017, Jack Link's extended its "Messin' with Sasquatch" ad campaign to feature NBA player Karl-Anthony Towns.

The company also employs a nutritionist, Christina Meyer-Jax, to explain the dietary value of protein as part of their marketing.

, the company sells apparel in their online store.

Controversy 

In December of 2021, six European supermarket chains, including two owned by the Dutch firm Ahold Delhaize and a Carrefour subsidiary, said they would stop selling some or all beef products from Brazil. The companies' decision was made due to suspected ties with the clearing of segments of the Amazon rainforest for local cattle farming. The world's largest meatpacker JBS and Jack Link's each source cattle from Brazil.

References

External links

Official Website Australia
Jack Links: Big growth in little Alpena

Brand name snack foods
Food and drink companies based in Wisconsin
1986 establishments in Wisconsin
Bigfoot in popular culture
American companies established in 1986
Food and drink companies established in 1986
Washburn County, Wisconsin